Hans Leitert (born 15 January 1973) is a former Austrian goalkeeping coach and current consultant within the football industry. In February 2018, Leitert began working with Liverpool F.C. in a consultancy role.

Career as Coach 

He has coached at VfB Mödling, SK Rapid Vienna, FK Austria Vienna, before coaching the goalkeepers of the  Austria national under-21 team, followed by coaching the first team keepers at international clubs Panathinaikos, Real Club Recreativo de Huelva and Tottenham Hotspur.

After having coached the Austrian Under 21 national team for 6 years, Hans went to Panathinaikos as goalkeeping coach where he worked alongside Italian Alberto Malesani, then Swedish Head Coach Hans Backe and afterwards Spaniard Víctor Muñoz. In 2007 he left Athens and in 2008 helped Spanish side Real Club Recreativo de Huelva to stay in the Primera Division. He joined Tottenham Hotspur in May 2008 with Juande Ramos as manager. He left Spurs in the same year after the sacking of Ramos.

From July 2010 until December 2015 Hans Leitert was Head of Goalkeeping at Red Bull's football project where he was responsible for all goalkeeping related topics for all Red Bull’s football clubs FC Red Bull Salzburg, RB Leipzig, New York Red Bulls and Red Bull Brasil (until 2013 also Red Bull Ghana).

In February 2018 Leitert was appointed as a goalkeeping consultant for Premier League team Liverpool F.C.

Latest 

In January 2016 he founded his own Sports Consulting limited, based in London, UK, where he works as a consultant within the football industry, linked and contracted to mainly high elite organizations such as top flight clubs or federations.

Additional 

Leitert was born in Vienna. He was formerly a goalkeeper for the Austrian under-21 and under-18 teams, before having to retire early due to a broken scaphoid bone (wrist). He holds a Master's degree in Sports Science and speaks at goalkeeping lectures on behalf of UEFA and FIFA as well as the Spanish Football Association.

Publications 

In 2008, he published his book "The Art Of Goalkeeping Or The Seven Principles Of The Masters" in English.

Family 

Hans Leitert is married and has one daughter.

References

External links

1973 births
Living people
Austrian footballers
Footballers from Vienna
Association football goalkeepers
Tottenham Hotspur F.C. non-playing staff